The 1913–14 Southern Football League season was the 20th in the history of the Southern League. Swindon Town won their second Southern League championship, whilst Coventry City and Merthyr Town were relegated to Division Two. Croydon Common won the Division Two championship on goal difference and were promoted to Division One along with runners-up Luton Town. Division Two club Stoke applied to join the Football League, but finished third in the ballot and were rejected.

Several Welsh clubs in Division Two left the League at the end of the season, though many returned after World War I.

Division One

A total of 20 teams contest the division, including 18 sides from previous season and two new teams.

Teams promoted from 1912–13 Division Two:
 Cardiff City - champions
 Southend United - runners-up

Division Two

A total of 16 teams contest the division, including 11 sides from previous season, two teams relegated from Division One and three new teams.

Teams relegated from 1912–13 Division One:
 Brentford
 Stoke
Newly elected teams:
 Abertillery
 Barry
 Caerphilly

External links
Southern League First Division Tables at RSSSF
Southern League Second Division Tables at RSSSF
Football Club History Database

1913-14
3
1913–14 in Welsh football